Kurot sa Puso is the second studio album by Filipino singer Donna Cruz (then using the mononym Donna), released in the Philippines in 1993 by Viva Records. It was originally released on compact disc and cassette tape and is the last album by Cruz to be released on vinyl. The album was digitally released by Viva Records on iTunes on April 2006.

Background
Following the success of her debut album Donna, Cruz returned to recording a studio album in 1990. According to Vic del Rosario, Jr., head of VIVA Entertainment Group, the success of the single "Kapag Tumibok ang Puso" put so much pressure on Cruz that they decided to take time in recording her next album. The song "Kurot sa Puso" did not perform as well as Cruz' previous hits like "Rain" or "Kapag Tumibok ang Puso" but the album was certified gold nonetheless. No further singles were released soon after as Cruz began her involvement in more television acting projects like as Alabang Girls and Ober Da Bakod.

Track listing

References

1992 albums
Donna Cruz albums